Hatchetfish may refer to three groups of fishes:

Marine hatchetfishes, small deep-sea bioluminescent fishes (Stomiiformes) of the family Sternoptychidae, subfamily Sternoptychinae.
Freshwater hatchetfishes, small South and Central American characins of the family Gasteropelecidae.
Triportheus, the elongate hatchetfish, small South American freshwater characins of the family Triporthidae.